In the 1997–98 season Real Club Deportivo Mallorca competed in La Liga and Copa del Rey.

Summary
The club with the President Bartolome Beltran appointed on 10 July 1997, Argentinian head coach Héctor Cúper from Lanús as its new manager, winning the spot ahead of Portuguese José Mourinho. After winning the relegation playoff defeating Rayo Vallecano and Cuper secured, Beltran announced several transfers in for the La Liga newcomer team: Brazilian attacking midfielder Palhinha (1994 FIFA World Cup Champion) arrived from Cruzeiro, Brazilian right back Ivan Rocha and Argentinian striker Gabriel Amato from Hércules CF. On 15 August 1997 Argentinian goalkeeper Carlos Roa and right winger Oscar Mena were transferred in from Lanús.

Also, Beltran negotiated six transfers from Valencia CF due to these players were discarded by Argentinian coach Jorge Valdano: left back Enrique Romero, defensive midfielder Vicente Engonga, Galvez, striker Moya, central back Iván Campo and midfielder Xabier Eskurza. Two more incorporations attacking midfielder Juan Carlos Valeron from UD Las Palmas and left winger Jovan Stankovic from CD Logroñés, both players arrived to the club after the few chances of play in their former teams.

Squad
Squad at end of season

Transfers

Left club during season

Arrived club during season

Competitions

La Liga

League table

Positions by round

Matches

Copa del Rey

Second round

Third round

Eightfinals

Quarterfinals

Semifinals

Final

Statistics

Players Statistics

See also
RCD Mallorca
1997–98 La Liga
1997–98 Copa del Rey

References

RCD Mallorca seasons
Mallorca